Faraone is a surname. Notable people with the surname include:

Chris Faraone, American journalist and author
Davide Faraone (born 1975), Italian politician
Lorenzo Faraone, Australian electrical and electronic engineer, professor at the University of Western Australia
Roberto Faraone Mennella (1971–2020), Italian-born American jeweller
Stephen Faraone (born 1956), American psychologist, professor and author